Archie Francis Moore (born August 30, 1941) is an American former Major League Baseball player. Moore appeared in forty games for the New York Yankees during the 1964 and 1965 seasons, as an outfielder, first baseman and pinch hitter. He batted and threw left-handed.

Biography
Moore grew up in Florham Park, New Jersey. and attended Hanover Park High School in East Hanover Township together with future MLB pitcher Harry Fanok.

He was signed by the Yankees as an amateur free agent in 1963.

References

External links

1941 births
Living people
All-American college baseball players
Hanover Park High School alumni
Major League Baseball outfielders
New York Yankees players
Baseball players from New Jersey
Baseball players from Pennsylvania
Springfield Pride baseball players
Pan American Games medalists in baseball
Pan American Games silver medalists for the United States
People from Florham Park, New Jersey
Sportspeople from Morris County, New Jersey
Baseball players at the 1963 Pan American Games
Medalists at the 1963 Pan American Games
Asheville Tourists players
Binghamton Triplets players
Indianapolis Indians players
Syracuse Chiefs players
Toledo Mud Hens players